Melbourne Opera was founded in 2002 as a charitable not-for-profit company dedicated to producing opera and associated art forms in Melbourne, Victoria. With philanthropic assistance it has also toured to outer-suburban and regional Victorian theatres, as well as to Canberra and Hobart interstate. Despite receiving no government funding since its foundation, the company mounts between three to five main stage productions each year. Its principal rehearsal and performance home is the Athenaeum Theatre.

Melbourne Opera is the business and trading name of South East Regional Touring Opera Ltd. The corporate name was changed on 1 June 2007 to reflect the Company's much expanded geographical scope.

History

Melbourne Opera's inaugural season consisted of La traviata directed by Blair Edgar, a new production of Bizet's The Pearl Fishers using Bizet's restored 1863 score, and Mozart's The Magic Flute, directed by Caroline Stacey. A proposed merger with Melbourne City Opera, in 2005, did not proceed. In 2006 the company's first large scale tour commenced with a production of Don Giovanni travelling to Ballarat, Benalla, Frankston, Geelong, Hobart, Plenty Ranges, Sale, Warrnambool, and the Theatre Royal, Hobart. From 2010 to 2018 the company partnered with Monash University to bring performances to its Clayton Campus. In 2017 Melbourne Opera established the Richard Divall Emerging Artists Programme. In 2020 the company announced that it was embarking on a four-year project to perform Wagner's Der Ring des Nibelungen, commencing with Das Rheingold. This production was postponed due to the global outbreak of COVID-19 and was premiered in early 2021. It was the first independent production of Der Ring des Nibelungen to be staged Australia in over 100 years.

Productions

 2003 La traviata (Verdi), The Pearl Fishers (Bizet), The Magic Flute (Mozart)
 2004 Madama Butterfly (Puccini), Rigoletto (Verdi), Così fan tutte (Mozart)
 2005 Madama Butterfly (Puccini), The Tell-Tale Heart (Dennis Vaughan)**, Die Fledermaus (Johann Strauss II)
 2006 Don Giovanni (Mozart), The Barber of Seville (Rossini), Madama Butterfly (Puccini)
 2007 Madama Butterfly (Puccini), Carmen (Bizet), Cavalleria rusticana (Mascagni), Suor Angelica (Puccini), The Italian Girl in Algiers (Rossini), The Barber of Seville (Rossini).
 2008 La bohème (Puccini), The Marriage of Figaro (Mozart), I puritani (Bellini)
 2009 La traviata (Verdi), The Barber of Seville (Rossini), Maria Stuarda (Donizetti)
 2016 The Abduction from the Seraglio (Mozart), Tannhäuser (Wagner), Anna Bolena (Donizetti)*
 2017 H.M.S. Pinafore (Gilbert and Sullivan), Lohengrin (Wagner), Roberto Devereux (Donizetti)
 2018 Tristan und Isolde (Wagner), Der Rosenkavalier (Richard Strauss), Otello (Rossini)*
 2019 The Flying Dutchman (Wagner), Norma (Donizetti)
 2020 Fidelio (Beethoven)
2021 Das Rheingold (Wagner), Macbeth (Verdi)

* Australian premiere
** World premiere
† Concert performance

Governance

Melbourne Opera is charitable company governed by a board; the current chair is Michael Flemming. There is also a chairman's advisory council consisting of twenty leading figures drawn from the opera and business world.

Patrons
Patron-in-Chief: Lady Potter AC CMRI
Patron: Maestro Richard Bonynge AC CBE
Founding Patrons: Sir Zelman Cowen AK GCMG GCVO KStJ QC, Prof Richard Divall AO OBE, Sir Rupert Hamer AC KCMG, Lady Hamer, Dame Elisabeth Murdoch AC DBE, Dame Joan Sutherland OM AC CBE.

Orchestra

The Melbourne Opera Orchestra was founded in 2003 and has developed into an ensemble in its own right. In December 2015/January 2016, and December 2016/January 2017 the orchestra undertook a concert tour of China.

Conductors
Greg Hocking AM is Melbourne Opera's conductor-in-residence and Raymond Lawrence is Head of Music. Guest conductors include John Dingle, Richard Divall, Patrick Burns, Ben Hudson, David Kram AM, Anthony Negus, Aldo Salvagno, Warwick Stengards and Matthew Toogood.

Stage Directors
Directors who have worked with the company include: Bruce Beresford, Greg Carroll, Suzanne Chaundy, Blair Edgar, Hugh Halliday, Plamen Kartaloff, Robert Ray, and Caroline Stacey.

Richard Divall Emerging Artists Programme
The Richard Divall Emerging Artists Programme was created to honour the memory of Maestro Richard Divall AO OBE, supported by a bequest made by Melbourne born soprano, Sylvia Fisher. Upon her death, Fisher made this bequest to ensure the continuing support of the development new artists of operatic excellence in her hometown, Melbourne. Divall was closely involved in the planning and creation of this program before his death in 2017. The first intake of performers was in 2018.

The Programme aims to develop singers of great potential to a performance-ready standard, focusing on providing opportunities for emerging opera singers to experience the pressure of intensive role preparation, rehearsal and performance in a professional setting whilst continuing artistic development with tailored high quality coaching, workshops, master classes and mentoring.

References

External links

Australian opera companies
Musical groups established in 2002
2002 establishments in Australia
Performing arts in Melbourne